Stephen Glickman may refer to:

 Stephen H. Glickman (born 1948), American judge 
 Stephen Kramer Glickman (born 1979), Canadian actor, music producer and comedian